CDP-abequose synthase (rfbJ (gene)) is an enzyme with systematic name CDP-alpha-D-abequose:NADP+ 4-oxidoreductase. This enzyme catalyses the following chemical reaction

 CDP-alpha-D-abequose + NADP+  CDP-4-dehydro-3,6-dideoxy-alpha-D-glucose + NADPH + H+

This enzyme is from Yersinia pseudotuberculosis and Salmonella enterica.

References

External links 
 

EC 1.1.1